Amanda Glover (born 16 July 1970) is a British beach volleyball player. She competed in the women's tournament at the 1996 Summer Olympics.

References

External links
 

1970 births
Living people
British women's beach volleyball players
English women's beach volleyball players
Olympic beach volleyball players of Great Britain
Beach volleyball players at the 1996 Summer Olympics
Sportspeople from Weymouth